The 1947 Catawba Indians football team was an American football team that represented Catawba College as a member of the North State Conference during the 1947 college football season. In its 14th season under head coach Gordon Kirkland, the team compiled an 11–1 record, won the North State championship, defeated Marshall in the 1948 Tangerine Bowl, shut out 10 of 12 opponents, and outscored opponents by a total of 265 to 27.

On October 25, 1947, Catawba tied (and later broke) the national consecutive game scoring record. The prior record of 72 games was claimed by Yale during the 19th century.  After losing to Catawba by a 39–0 score, Newberry's head coach Billy Laval said: "They've got a real ball club. Should be playing Furman, Clemson and Carolina. They're out of our league." In the AP Poll released on December 1, 1947, Catawba was ranked No. 20.

Catawba fullback Lee Spears led the NSIC in scoring with 67 points (not counting the six points he scored in the Tangerine Bowl), and the team's place-kicking specialist Lamar Dorton led the conference in with 20 point-after-touchdown kicks.

Schedule

References

Catawba
Catawba Indians football seasons
Citrus Bowl champion seasons
Catawba Indians football